Destination may refer to:

Music
Destination (group), a disco studio group from New York
Destination (Eloy album), 1992
Destination (FictionJunction Yuuka album), 2005
Destination (Ronan Keating album), 2002
Destination (EP), by SS501, 2010
The Destination, an EP by Vonthongchai Intarawat, 2008
Destination, an album by Akina Nakamori, 2006
"Destination", a song by The Church from Starfish

Other uses
Destination (game), a board game
Destination (magazine), a monthly lifestyle magazine published in Saudi Arabia
Destination Films, a division of Sony Pictures
 Tourist destination, a place commercially dedicated to tourism

See also
Destiny (disambiguation)